Poor Cinderella (original title as Betty Boop in Poor Cinderella) is a 1934 Fleischer Studios animated short film featuring Betty Boop. Poor Cinderella was Fleischer Studios' first color film, and the only appearance of Betty Boop in color during the Fleischer era. It is the final animated short presented by Max Fleischer and at Fleischer Studios, and the first Paramount Pictures animated short in color.

Plot
Cinderella (portrayed by Betty Boop) is a poor young woman forced to be the virtual slave of her two ugly stepsisters, who demand she prepare them for the prince's ball while she is left at home to lament her spinsterdom, singing that no one loves her and that her only respite is her dreams, but she holds out hope of being a real princess someday. Cinderella is visited by her fairy godmother, who grants her wish to attend the prince's ball, giving her beautiful clothes, a carriage, and the traditional glass slippers, with the warning that she must leave by midnight before the spell expires.

During the ball, Prince Charming, provoked by a mallet-wielding Cupid, descends the staircase in royal fashion and is instantly smitten by Cinderella. The two have a wonderful time dancing together, but when midnight strikes, she rushes out of the ball, leaving behind her shoe. The prince proclaims that whoever can fit her foot into the shoe shall be his wife; all the maidens in the land line up to try, with none in the queue able to fit until Cinderella arrives and fits into the shoe easily. The two are married, and the ugly stepsisters are left to argue with each other until the end title's doors smack their heads together.

Background
The short was made in the two-strip Cinecolor process, because Walt Disney had exclusive rights to the new 3-strip Technicolor process from 1932 to 1935. (The remaining Color Classics from 1934 and 1935 were made in two-color Technicolor.)  Betty's hair was colored red to take advantage of this. The short also used Fleischer Studio's Stereoptical process, in order to provide some scenes with additional depth of field.

Rudy Vallee appears in caricature, singing the title song during the ball sequence.

References

External links

Poor Cinderella at the Big Cartoon Database

1930s English-language films
1934 animated films
1934 short films
1930s children's fantasy films
1930s color films
1930s American animated films
1930s animated short films
1930s fantasy films
Color Classics cartoons
Films about weddings
Films based on Charles Perrault's Cinderella
Films based on Cinderella
Betty Boop cartoons
Fleischer Studios short films
Cinecolor films
Articles containing video clips
Paramount Pictures short films
Short films directed by Dave Fleischer
American animated short films